Coffee Regional Medical Center is the sole hospital provider in Douglas, Georgia, in the United States, and surrounding Coffee County, Georgia. The  facility opened in 1998 on Georgia State Route 32 west of downtown Douglas, Georgia and replaces the original structure built in 1953. The  hospital has 88 inpatient beds and is locally operated.

References

External links
 Coffee Regional Medical Center

Hospital buildings completed in 1953
Hospital buildings completed in 1998
Hospitals in Georgia (U.S. state)
Buildings and structures in Coffee County, Georgia
1998 establishments in Georgia (U.S. state)